Lewin is a surname.

Lewin may also refer to:

Places in Poland
 Lewin Brzeski
 Lewin Kłodzki
 Lewin, Kuyavian-Pomeranian Voivodeship
 Lewin, Łódź Voivodeship

Other uses
 T. M. Lewin, UK-based gentleman's shirtmakers
 The Lewin Group, a policy research and consulting organization

ru:Левин